Wels is a city in northern Austria.

Wels may also refer to:

the wels catfish, Silurus glanis
Otto Wels, German politician, chairman of SPD (1873–1939) 
Rudolf Wels, Czech architect (1882–1944)

See also
 WELS (disambiguation)
 Wells (disambiguation)